Tram Hollow is a valley in Oregon County in the U.S. state of Missouri.

Tram Hollow was so named on account of the tramway the valley once contained.

References

Valleys of Oregon County, Missouri
Valleys of Missouri